Stefan Kyon Lloyd Bailey (born 10 October 1987, in Brent, London) is an English semi-professional footballer who plays for Kempston Rovers.

Career
Bailey made his professional debut towards the end of the 2004–05 season at the age of 17, coming off the bench for Queens Park Rangers (QPR) in a Championship match away to Sheffield United. His premature call up was due to a lengthy injury list to Ian Holloway's side, but Bailey impressed with some strong tackles, good turns and an array of impressive passes. 

The following two seasons saw Bailey feature more regularly, but he failed to hold down a regular first team place, despite some promising displays.

On 12 October 2007, he was signed by Oxford United on a one-month loan, where he made three appearances in the Conference Premier.

Following his release from QPR, Bailey signed a one-year contract for Grays Athletic on 19 June 2008. He was transfer listed by the club in January 2009, with financial pressures and manager Wayne Burnett's plans being cited as the reason. Bailey was sent out on loan to Farnborough in March 2009.

Ebbsfleet United signed Bailey in August following a successful trial. He made his debut against Stevenage Borough on 18 August in Ebbsfleet's 3–0 away loss in the Conference Premier. Bailey was released by Ebbsfleet in the summer of 2010 and went on to sign an initial short-term contract with Conference North club AFC Telford United.

Bailey has since had spells with Kettering Town, two spells with Banbury United as well as a stint with Havant & Waterlooville. He then went on to sign for Isthmian Football League side Wealdstone and also had two spells with Dunstable Town.

After a spell at Wealdstone, Bailey re-signed for his second spell at Southern Football League Premier Division side Arlesey Town for the 2014–15 season, the side managed by Rufus Brevett.

Bailey went on to play for AFC Dunstable, Bovingdon, Barton Rovers and Kempston Rovers.

References

External links

1987 births
Living people
English footballers
Association football midfielders
Queens Park Rangers F.C. players
Oxford United F.C. players
Grays Athletic F.C. players
Ebbsfleet United F.C. players
Farnborough F.C. players
AFC Telford United players
Kettering Town F.C. players
Havant & Waterlooville F.C. players
Banbury United F.C. players
Wealdstone F.C. players
Dunstable Town F.C. players
Arlesey Town F.C. players
Barton Rovers F.C. players
English Football League players
National League (English football) players
Isthmian League players
Southern Football League players
Kempston Rovers F.C. players
Black British sportsmen